The Naval Research Laboratory Flyrt, or Flying Radar Target, was a small electric-powered unmanned aerial vehicle developed by the United States Naval Research Laboratory to serve as an expendable radar decoy for the defense of United States Navy ships. Tested in the fall of 1993, it was considered successful but was not ordered into production.

Design and development
Begun in 1991, the Flyrt program was intended to produce an expendable decoy drone, not requiring any new aboardship infrastructure, for the defense of warships against radar-guided antiship missiles. It produced a drone that was of conventional configuration, having a low-mounted, folding wing and a cruciform tail section; an electric motor was mounted in the nose of the aircraft. Launch was via a rocket booster, providing 1.6 seconds of thrust, from the Mark 137 launcher of the Mark 36 SRBOC system; the use of the Mark 36 launcher put a constraint on the possible size of the drone, which was designed to compact into a package the size of a standard NATO Mark 36 chaff rocket. The tail fins would unfold immediately on launch, while the wing would deploy and motor start after burnout as the aircraft coasted to the apogee of a ballistic trajectory. The expendable Flyrt carried a radio repeater with two antennae for spoofing enemy radar signals.

Operational history
Following a series of ballistic tests to verify compatibility of the launcher, the Flyrt trial program moved to full-scale tests of the vehicle, with the drone's first flight coming on 9 September 1993. Thirteen drones were constructed for the program, conducted at the NRL's Chesapeake Bay Detachment, which was considered successful; however, no production was undertaken.

Specifications

See also

References

Citations

Bibliography

FLYRT
1990s United States special-purpose aircraft
Low-wing aircraft
Single-engined tractor aircraft
Electric aircraft
Unmanned military aircraft of the United States
Decoy missiles of the United States
Aircraft first flown in 1993